Great Falls Generating Station is a hydroelectric dam on the Winnipeg River approximately 130 kilometres northeast of Winnipeg in the Rural Municipality of Alexander in the Canadian province of Manitoba.

The dam is owned and operated by Manitoba Hydro, and has a generating capacity of 130 megawatts. The Winnipeg Electric Railway Company began building the dam in 1914. First power was delivered in 1922, and the construction was completed in 1928.

In the fiscal year ending 31 March 2016, Great Falls contributed 2.31% of all generation in Manitoba, about 840 gigawatt-hours.

References

Hydroelectric power stations in Manitoba

Dams in Manitoba
Eastman Region, Manitoba